Charanjit Singh (1940 – 5 July 2015) was an Indian musician from Mumbai, who performed as a session musician, often as a guitarist or synthesizer player, in numerous Bollywood soundtrack orchestras from the 1960s to 1980s, working with filmi composers such as Shankar-Jaikishan, R.D. Burman, S.D. Burman, and Laxmikant–Pyarelal.

In the 21st century, Singh became known for his 1983 album Synthesizing: Ten Ragas to a Disco Beat following retrospective associations with acid house, both of which prominently feature the Roland TB-303. It received re-release in 2010 on the Bombay Connection label.

Biography
Singh led a wedding band and recorded and released a number of albums covering popular film songs. These were a form of instrumental elevator music, some of which have since been re-released by Sublime Frequencies, such as his steel guitar renditions of "Manje Re" from Bandhe Haath in 1973 and "Chura Liyaa Hai Tumne" from Yaadon Ki Baaraat in 1975. In 1981, he produced synthesizer-based electronic renditions of the Silsila soundtrack in his record Charanjit Singh: Plays Hit Tunes on Synthesizer of Silsila.

Synthesizing: Ten Ragas to a Disco Beat, an album of original electronic disco compositions Singh recorded in 1982, was a commercial failure at the time of its original release, but its re-discovery in 2002 and re-issue in early 2010 garnered attention due to comparisons with acid house from the mid to late 1980s. Since then, certain commentators in the music press have recast Singh as an originator of acid house music. He also used the same drum machine and synthesizers for his experimental electronic calypso record, Experiments in Calypso. His son Raju Singh is a composer, who has scored for films and television shows.

Charanjit Singh died of cardiac arrest in his sleep during the midnight of 4 July 2015 at his home in Bandra, Mumbai.

Synthesizing: Ten Ragas to a Disco Beat

In the 21st century, Charanjit Singh gained attention for his 1982 release Synthesizing: Ten Ragas to a Disco Beat, an album originally intended as a fusion of electronic disco music with Indian classical ragas. Singh's use of both the TR-808 drum machine and TB-303 bass synthesizer has led some music journalists to suggest that it is perhaps the earliest example of acid house music; predating Phuture's seminal Chicago acid house record "Acid Tracks" (1987) by five years. Comparisons have also been made with the work of other electronic dance musicians who were inspired by acid house such as Ceephax, Phuture 303, and Aphex Twin. According to The Guardian writer Stuart Aitken, Singh's record was "far ahead" of its time.

Production
Singh produced Ten Ragas using three electronic musical instruments made by the Roland Corporation: the Jupiter-8 synthesizer, Roland TR-808, and Roland TB-303. It was one of the first records to use the TB-303, a machine that has become synonymous with acid house. Singh had bought his TB-303 in Singapore soon after its introduction in late 1981. He didn't know much about the three machines at first, so he spent much time in figuring out how to use them, and eventually discovered that it was possible to synchronise the TR-808 and TB-303 with the Jupiter-8 keyboard. According to Singh: "At home I practised with the combination and I thought 'It sounds good – why not record it'." While the TB-303 was originally designed to fill in for a bass guitar, it was awkward when it came to reproducing conventional basslines, so he found a different way to employ the machine, particularly its glissando function which made it suitable for reproducing the Indian raga melodies.

Besides Indian raga music, he also took inspiration from contemporary Bollywood music, or filmi music, specifically the Indian electronic disco scene that had only just become popular in the early 1980s (sparked by the success of Pakistani pop singer Nazia Hassan and Indian producer Biddu), at a time when disco's popularity had declined in the United States. In parallel to the Euro disco scene at the time, the continued relevance of disco in India and the increasing reliance on synthesizers led to experiments in minimalist, high-tempo, electronic disco, such as R.D. Burman's "Dil Lena Khel Hai Dildar Ka" (Zamane Ko Dikhana Hai, 1981) which had a "futuristic electro feel" and Bappi Lahari's "Yaad Aa Raha Hai" (Disco Dancer, 1982). Such developments eventually culminated in the work of Singh, who increased the tempo and made the sounds more minimalistic, while pairing them with instrumental Indian ragas using his new equipment setup.

According to Singh: "There was lots of disco music in films back in 1982. So I thought why not do something different using disco music only. I got an idea to play all the Indian ragas and give the beat a disco beat – and turn off the tabla. And I did it. And it turned out good." The first track "Raga Bhairavi" also features a synthesised voice that says "Om Namah Shivaya" through a vocoder.

Release
The album was released under the label Gramophone Company of India (now Sa Re Ga Ma), having been recorded at their HMV Studio in Bombay (now Mumbai) in 1982. Following the LP record's release in 1982, it garnered some interest in India, finding its way onto Indian national radio, but it became a commercial failure and was largely forgotten until recent years. However, Singh may have played a role in popularising electronic music in Bollywood at the time, and a somewhat similar "techno-sounding interlude" had later appeared in Lahiri's song "Kasam Paida Karne Wale Ki" from the film of the same name in 1984.

Live performance
From 2012 until his death in 2015, Singh performed the material from Ten Ragas to a Disco Beat live.

Track listing
Both the original 1982 and 1983 LP records and the 2010 CD and LP re-releases contain the following five-minute-long tracks named after ragas:

"Raga Bhairavi" – 4:59
"Raga Lalit" – 4:55
"Raga Bhupali" – 4:53
"Raga Todi" – 4:52
"Raga Madhuvanti" – 4:59
"Raga Meghmalhar" – 5:01
"Raga Yaman" – 5:06
"Raga Kalavati" – 5:08
"Raga Malkauns" – 5:02
"Raga Bairagi" – 5:07

See also
Goa trance
House music
Indi-pop
Music of India
Psychedelic music
Raga rock

References

External links
 
 

Musicians from Mumbai
Indian male classical musicians
Acid house musicians
House musicians
Disco musicians
Techno musicians
2015 deaths
1940 births
20th-century Indian male musicians